The 1974 Indiana Hoosiers football team represented the Indiana Hoosiers in the 1974 Big Ten Conference football season. They participated as members of the Big Ten Conference. The Hoosiers played their home games at Memorial Stadium in Bloomington, Indiana. The team was coached by Lee Corso, in his second year as head coach of the Hoosiers.

Schedule

1975 NFL draftees

References

Indiana
Indiana Hoosiers football seasons
Indiana Hoosiers football